The year 2002 was the 221st year of the Rattanakosin Kingdom of Thailand. It was the 57th year in the reign of King Bhumibol Adulyadej (Rama IX), and is reckoned as year 2545 in the Buddhist Era.

Incumbents
King: Bhumibol Adulyadej 
Crown Prince: Vajiralongkorn
Prime Minister: Thaksin Shinawatra
Supreme Patriarch: Nyanasamvara Suvaddhana

Events

March
Miss Thailand Universe 2002 took place on March 23. Janjira Janchome was the winner of the beauty contest.

June

Survivor: Thailand, a reality television series of Survivor, was filmed from June 10 to July 18 on Ko Tarutao. Brian Heidik was the winner.

September

Thailand competed in the 2002 Asian Games, which lasted from September 29 to October 14.

December

Thailand began competing in the 2002 Tiger Cup in December. They would eventually win the tournament, which ended on December 29.

Births

Deaths

See also
 Thailand at the 2002 Asian Games
 2002 Thailand National Games
 2002 in Thai television
 List of Thai films of 2002

References

External links
Year 2002 Calendar - Thailand

 
Years of the 21st century in Thailand
Thailand
Thailand
2000s in Thailand